William Jay Smith (April 22, 1918 – August 18, 2015) was an American poet. He was appointed the nineteenth Poet Laureate Consultant in Poetry to the Library of Congress from 1968 to 1970.

Life 
William Jay Smith was born in Winnfield, Louisiana.  He was brought up at Jefferson Barracks, Missouri, south of St. Louis. Smith received his A.B. and M.A. from Washington University in St. Louis and continued his studies at Columbia University. Smith later attended Wadham College, Oxford as a Rhodes Scholar and continued his education at the University of Florence.

In 1947 he married the poet Barbara Howes and they lived for a time in England and Italy. They had two sons, David Smith and Gregory. They divorced in the mid-1960s.

Smith was a poet in residence at Williams College from 1959–1967 and taught at Columbia University from 1973 until 1975. He served as the Professor Emeritus of English literature at Hollins University. He was the first Native American named to the position of Poet Laureate in the United States.

As of 2008, he lived in houses located in both Cummington, Massachusetts, and Paris, France.

Smith was the author of ten collections of poetry of which two were finalists for the National Book Award.

He had been a member of the American Academy of Arts and Letters since 1975.

His work appeared in Harper's Magazine, The New York Review of Books,

Works

Poetry
 
 
 
 
  reprint 2002
 

 Poems for children 
  reprint 1980
 
 
  rev. ed., 1989
 
 

Translations
 
 Poems of a Multimillionaire by Valéry Larbaud (1955)
  reprint 1972
 Two Plays by Charles Bertin : "Christopher Columbus" and "Don Juan" (1970)
 Songs of C,  Federico García Lorca (1994).

Non-fiction
 
 
 

Editor
 
 

Plays
 

Awards
 1945 Young Poets prize, Poetry
 1964 Ford fellowship for drama
 1970 Henry Bellamann Major award
 1972 Loines award
 1972, 1995 National Endowment for the Arts grant
 1975, 1989 National Endowment for the Humanities grant
 1978 Gold Medal of Labor (Hungary)
 1980 New England Poetry Club Golden Rose Award
 1982 Ingram Merrill Foundation grant
 1990 California Children's Book and Video Awards recognition for excellence (pre-school and toddlers category), for Ho for a Hat! 1991 medal (médaille de vermeil) for service to the French language, French Academy
 1993 Pro Cultura Hungarica medal
 twice a nominee for the National Book Award in poetry
 1997 René Vásquez Díaz prize, Swedish Academy

References

External links
 
 
 
 
 
 

External links
"The CPR Interview: William Jay Smith", The Contemporary Poetry Review''
The William Jay Smith Papers at Washington University in St. Louis 
"William Jay Smith", 2004 National Book Festival

1918 births
2015 deaths
People from Winnfield, Louisiana
American expatriates in the United Kingdom
American male poets
Williams College faculty
American Poets Laureate
American Rhodes Scholars
Formalist poets
Washington University in St. Louis alumni
Columbia University alumni
People from Cummington, Massachusetts
Columbia University faculty
Hollins University faculty